Köprüalan can refer to:

 Köprüalan, Çorum
 Köprüalan, Söke